The 2018 Banja Luka Challenger was a professional tennis tournament played on clay courts. It was the seventeenth edition of the tournament which was part of the 2018 ATP Challenger Tour. It took place in Banja Luka, Bosnia and Herzegovina from 10 to 16 September 2018.

Singles main-draw entrants

Seeds

 1 Rankings are as of 27 August 2018.

Other entrants
The following players received wildcards into the singles main draw:
  Marko Miladinović
  Franjo Raspudić
  Kento Tagashira
  Miljan Zekić

The following player received entry into the singles main draw as a special exempt:
  Thomaz Bellucci

The following players received entry from the qualifying draw:
  Federico Coria
  Aslan Karatsev
  Alexandar Lazov
  Andrea Vavassori

Champions

Singles

 Alessandro Giannessi def.  Carlos Berlocq 6–7(6–8), 6–4, 6–4.

Doubles

 Andrej Martin /  Hans Podlipnik Castillo def.  Laurynas Grigelis /  Alessandro Motti 7–5, 4–6, [10–7].

External links
Official Website

2018 in Bosnia and Herzegovina sport
2018 ATP Challenger Tour
2018
September 2018 sports events in Europe